Yellow Bay State Park is a public recreation area occupying  on the eastern shore of Flathead Lake  south of Bigfork in Lake County, Montana. The state park offers boating, fishing, camping, swimming, and wildlife viewing.

References

External links
Yellow Bay State Park Montana Fish, Wildlife & Parks

State parks of Montana
Protected areas of Lake County, Montana
Protected areas established in 1941
1941 establishments in Montana